Woodlyn may refer to:

Woodlyn, Ohio
Woodlyn, Pennsylvania

See also
Woodlynne, New Jersey